Podgórzyn may refer to the following places in Poland:
Podgórzyn, Lower Silesian Voivodeship (south-west Poland)
Podgórzyn, Kuyavian-Pomeranian Voivodeship (north-central Poland)
Podgórzyn, Warmian-Masurian Voivodeship (north Poland)